The 2016 Kansas Jayhawks baseball team represent the University of Kansas during the 2016 NCAA Division I baseball season. The Jayhawks play their home games at Hoglund Ballpark as a member of the Big 12 Conference. They are led by head coach Ritch Price, in his 14th season at Kansas.

Previous season
The 2015 Kansas Jayhawks baseball team notched a 23–32 (8–15) record and finished ninth in the Big 12 Conference standings. The Jayhawks did not qualify for the 2015 Big 12 Conference baseball tournament or receive at-large bid to the 2015 NCAA Division I baseball tournament.

Personnel

Roster

Coaching staff

Schedule and results

All rankings from Collegiate Baseball as-of the date of the contest.

References

Kansas Jayhawks
Kansas Jayhawks baseball seasons
Kansas Jay